Saud al-Dosari (‎; 23 August 1968 – 7 August 2015) was a Saudi television presenter, best known for his work for the Middle East Broadcasting Center (MBC). He was born in Dilam, Al-Kharj.

Death
Al-Dosari died at the age of 47 from a heart attack in Paris, France. He was later laid to rest in Riyadh.

References

1968 births
2015 deaths
Saudi Arabian television presenters
People from Riyadh Province